Brajan Gruda (born 31 May 2004) is a German professional footballer who plays as a winger for Mainz 05.

Club career
Born in Speyer, Gruda began his career with local side FV Speyer, before joining Karlsruher SC in 2015. At the age of 14 he joined Mainz 05 and made his debut in the Bundesliga in January 2023.

International career
Gruda is of Albanian descent. He has represented Germany at youth international level.

Personal life
Gruda is the son of German-born, former Vllaznia player Bujar Gruda. Other family members, including Ildi Gruda, have also played in Albania.
His uncles Selman Gruda,Aziz Gruda,Xhabir Gruda,Shpetim Gruda all played professional football with their home teams.

Career statistics

Club

References

External links
 Profile at the 1. FSV Mainz 05 website 

2004 births
Living people
People from Speyer
German people of Albanian descent
German footballers
Germany youth international footballers
Association football wingers
Association football midfielders
Bundesliga players
FV Speyer players
Karlsruher SC players
1. FSV Mainz 05 players
21st-century German people